The American Board of Anesthesiology sets standards and exams for the accreditation of  Board certified anesthesiologists coming to the end of their residency. It is one of the 24 medical specialty boards that constitutes the American Board of Medical Specialties.

Former Directors include
 Rolland John Whitacre: famous for his design of a subarachnoid needle tip
 Edward Boyce Tuohy: famous for his design of an epidural needle

See also
 American Osteopathic Board of Anesthesiology

References
  Official website
 Notable Names Anaesthesia by Roger Maltby 

Anesthesiology organizations